Minato (港 or 湊) is Japanese for 'harbor', and may refer to:

Places 
 Minato, Tokyo or Minato City, a special ward in Tokyo, Japan
 Minato-ku, Nagoya, a ward of Nagoya, Japan
 Minato-ku, Osaka, a ward of Osaka, Japan
 Minato (湊), a neighbourhood in Chūō or Chūō City, a special ward in Tokyo, Japan

People 
 Nicolò Minato (c. 1627–1698), Italian poet, librettist and impresario
 Yusuke Minato (born 1985), Japanese Nordic combined skier
 Chihiro Minato (born 1960), Japanese photographer
 Kanae Minato (born 1973), Japanese murder-mystery novelist
 , Japanese rower
 Minato Oike (born 1996), Japanese BMX freestyle cyclist
 Minatofuji Takayuki (born 1968), sumo wrestler now known as Minato Oyakata
 , Japanese football player
 , Japanese professional sumo wrestler
 , Japanese politician

Fictional characters 
 Sahashi Minato, protagonist of the manga series Sekirei
 Minato Namikaze, a character in the manga and anime series Naruto
 Minato Arisato, the protagonist's name in the Persona 3 manga adaptation
 Minato Nagase, a character in the visual novel Akaneiro ni Somaru Saka
 Minato Aqua, one of Hololive Production's virtual YouTubers
 Fuwa Minato, one of Nijisanji's virtual YouTubers

Other uses 
 Minato, a double espresso coffee with milk; see Milk coffee#Minato
 Minato Bridge, a 1974 double-deck cantilever truss bridge in Osaka, Japan
 Minato Line, a Japanese railway line between Katsuta and Ajigaura
 Minato Shimbun, a Japanese newspaper
 Minato stable, a stable of sumo wrestlers
 Minato Station, a train station in Sakai-ku, Osaka Prefecture, Japan

See also
 Minato Ward (disambiguation)
 港区 (disambiguation), the equivalent in CJKV
 Minato-kai, original name of the Japanese crime syndicate Sumiyoshi-kai

Japanese-language surnames
Japanese unisex given names